Curacoa is a submarine volcano located south of the Curacoa Reef in northern Tonga. The reef is 24fm North of Tafahi in the Niua Islands. Eruptions were observed in 1973 and 1979 from two separate vents. The 1973 eruption produced a large raft of dacitic pumice, and had a volcanic explosivity index (VEI) of 3.

See also
List of volcanoes in Tonga

References

Volcanoes of Tonga
Submarine volcanoes
Active volcanoes